This is a list of Principals of Queen Mary University of London. , Queen Mary has had a total of 22 principals (11 of Westfield College, eight of Queen Mary College, and three since the merger of Queen Mary, Westfield, and Barts).

The current principal is Colin Bailey, a structural engineer, who became Principal in September 2017.

Westfield College

Queen Mary College

Queen Mary University of London

References

Queen Mary University of London
Queen Mary